Oleksandr Gennadiyevich Rezanov (born October 14, 1948 in Alexandrovsk-Sakhalinsky, RSFSR) is a former Soviet/Ukrainian handball player who competed in the 1972 Summer Olympics and in the 1976 Summer Olympics.

In 1972 he was part of the Soviet team which finished fifth. He played all six matches and scored three goals.

In 1976 later he won the gold medal with the Soviet team. He played all six matches and scored three goals again.

References

1945 births
Living people
People from Alexandrovsk-Sakhalinsky District
Soviet male handball players
Ukrainian male handball players
Handball players at the 1972 Summer Olympics
Handball players at the 1976 Summer Olympics
Olympic handball players of the Soviet Union
Olympic gold medalists for the Soviet Union
Olympic medalists in handball
Ukrainian people of Russian descent
Medalists at the 1976 Summer Olympics
ZTR players
20th-century Ukrainian people